Marvin Höner (born 4 May 1994) is a German former professional footballer who played as a striker.

Club career

Arminia Bielefeld
Born in Bielefeld, Höner is an academy product of local 2. Bundesliga club Arminia Bielefeld. He played for the club's A-Juniors team in the 2012–13 Under 19 Bundesliga season, scoring ten goals in 12 matches.  His performances for his club as well as for the German national under-19 team drew attention from several clubs, including Ajax. He was invited to a trial by Ajax and played for the Ajax A1 team in the annual Copa Amsterdam, scoring once.

Ajax
On 24 June 2013, Höner signed a two-year contract with Ajax. With a year remaining on his contract with Arminia Bielefeld, an undisclosed transfer fee between the two clubs was agreed. It was later revealed that the fee was €150,000 (an initial €50,000 payment, and an additional €100,000 when Höner breaks into the first team). Arminia Bielefeld was to also receive a further €100,000, should Ajax decide to sell the striker. Höner is the fifth German player to sign for Ajax.

During the 2013–14 pre-season, Höner made his first appearance as a 63rd-minute substitute for Ajax in a 3–0 friendly match win over De Graafschap on 13 July 2013. On 5 August 2013, he made his professional debut for the reserves team Jong Ajax in a 2–0 Eerste Divisie victory over Telstar.

However, due to injuries, Höner was sidelined for a year and a half during his spell with Ajax.

SV Rödinghausen
Having spent a trial period with Ajax partner club Ajax Cape Town in South Africa, towards the end of the 2014–15 season. Höner was able to impress but opted to return to Germany, signing with SV Rödinghausen instead.

After leaving SV Rödinghausen Höner joined a sixth-division club.

International career
Höner made his debut for the German national under-19 team in a 3–0 friendly match win over France on 14 November 2012. His second appearance came in a 1–0 away loss to Italy on 6 February 2013.

Career statistics

Notes

References

External links
 
 

1994 births
Living people
Sportspeople from Bielefeld
Association football forwards
German footballers
Footballers from North Rhine-Westphalia
AFC Ajax players
Jong Ajax players
SV Rödinghausen players
Eerste Divisie players
German expatriate footballers
German expatriate sportspeople in the Netherlands
Expatriate footballers in the Netherlands